Eru is a village in Haljala Parish, Lääne-Viru County, in northern Estonia, on the territory of Lahemaa National Park. It's situated on the southeastern coast of the Eru Bay (part of the Gulf of Finland), just west of Võsu and southwest of Käsmu and Käsmu Peninsula. Eru has a population of 28 (as of 2006).

The southern half of the Lake Käsmu is located on the territory of Eru village. The territory is also bordered by the Käsmu Bay to the northeast.

Writer Jaan Kruusvall (1940–2012) was born in Eru. Former Prime Minister of Estonia Edgar Savisaar lives in Hundisilma farmstead in Eru village.

References

Villages in Lääne-Viru County